Saint Modest (died 489) was bishop of Trier when the Franks gained control over the city of Trier and he is considered a Pre-Congregational Saint. His feast day is 24 February.

Despite the turmoil he lived through he died in Trier in 489 of natural causes and his relics are enshrined in the church Saint Matthias, Trier, Germany.

References

External links
Modest at Patron Saints Index
24 February saints at St. Patrick's Church
San Modesto di Treviri, Vescovo

Year of birth missing
489 deaths
Medieval German saints
Burials at St. Matthias' Abbey
5th-century Christian saints
Roman Catholic bishops of Trier